Arró is a village located in the municipality of Es Bòrdes (Val d'Aran), Catalonia. It was an independent municipality before 1847.

Description
The village is located at an altitude of 885 m, to the right of the Garonne, in the extreme northwest of the municipal district. It has a small population of 25 inhabitants (2005), joined by a short branch on the N-230 road. It is presided over by the parochial church of Sant Martí, of Romanesque and Gothic origin with an octagonal bell tower.

References 

Populated places in Val d'Aran